Vođinci is a municipality in the Vukovar-Syrmia County in Croatia. According to the 2001 census, there are 2,113 inhabitants, 99.72% which are Croats. With pronounced issue of population decline in eastern Croatia caused by population ageing, effects of the Croatian War of Independence and emigration after the accession of Croatia to the European Union, the population of the municipality dropped to 1,634 residents at the time of 2021 census.

Name
The name of the village in Croatian is plural.

References

External links
Službene stranice - Official site

Municipalities of Croatia
Populated places in Syrmia
Populated places in Vukovar-Syrmia County